Sevda is a Turkish given name. Notable people with the name include:
Sevda Alakbarzadeh (born 1977), Azerbaijani singer
Sevda Altunoluk (born 1994), Turkish goalball player
 Sevda Alizadeh (born 1987), Iranian-Dutch singer
Sevda Dalgıç (born 1984), Turkish film and stage actress
Sevda Kılınç Çırakoğlu, Turkish para-athlete
Sevda Shishmanova, Bulgarian journalist and reporter
Sevda Sevan (1945–2009), Armenian-Bulgarian writer and diplomat

Turkish given names